Jacqueline Pashley (born 25 May 1979) is a former Dutch international cricketer whose career for the Dutch national side spanned from 2006 to 2008.

A wicket-keeper from the VRA Amsterdam club, Pashley made her One Day International (ODI) debut for the Netherlands in August 2006, in a series against Ireland. Over the following two years, she and Violet Wattenberg were in constant competition for the wicket-keeping position in the team. On several occasions, both players were named in the same team, with one playing as a specialist batsman. Pashley's final appearances for the Netherlands came when the West Indies toured in July 2008. She played in three out of the four ODIs on tour, and in the second of two Twenty20 Internationals, which was her only appearance in that format.

See also
 List of Netherlands women ODI cricketers
 List of Netherlands women Twenty20 International cricketers

References

1979 births
Dutch people of British descent
Dutch women cricketers
Living people
Netherlands women One Day International cricketers
Netherlands women Twenty20 International cricketers
Sportspeople from Alphen aan den Rijn
Wicket-keepers